Sadavat is a village in the Agdash Rayon of Azerbaijan. The village forms part of the municipality of Xosrov.

References 

Populated places in Agdash District